Harry Otto Anderson Jr. (October 14, 1927 – February 28, 1997) was an American football player and coach. He served as the head football coach at San Jose State University from 1965 to 1968, compiling a record of 13–26. One of the highlights of his career was a 1968 upset victory against BYU in the season finale. During his tenure, he coached future National Football League (NFL) head coach Al Saunders.

Head coaching record

References

1927 births
1997 deaths
San Jose State Spartans football coaches
Players of American football from Los Angeles
Coaches of American football from California
Sports coaches from Los Angeles